Pope Leo V was the bishop of Rome and nominal ruler of the Papal States from July 903 to his death in February 904. He was pope immediately before the period known as the Saeculum obscurum, when popes wielded little temporal authority.

Leo V was born at a place called Priapi, near Ardea. Although he was a priest when he was elected pope following the death of Pope Benedict IV (900–903), he was not a cardinal priest of Rome.

During his brief pontificate, Leo granted the canons of Bologna a special bull (epistola tuitionis) where he exempted them from the payment of taxes. However, after a reign of a little over two months, Leo was captured by Christopher, the cardinal-priest of San Lorenzo in Damaso, and thrown into prison. Christopher then had himself elected pope (903–904). Although now considered an antipope, he had until recently been considered a legitimate pope. If Leo never acquiesced to his deposition, then he can be considered legitimate pope until his death in 904.

Leo died shortly after being deposed. He was either murdered on the orders of Christopher, who was in turn executed by Sergius III (904–911) in 904, or, possibly, both were ordered to be killed at the beginning of Sergius’ pontificate, either on the orders of Sergius himself, or by the direction of Sergius' patron, Theophylact I of Tusculum. According to Horace K. Mann, it is more likely that Leo died a natural death in prison or in a monastery.

Notes

References

 DeCormenin, Louis Marie; Gihon, James L., A Complete History of the Popes of Rome, from Saint Peter, the First Bishop to Pius the Ninth (1857)
 Mann, Horace K., The Lives of the Popes in the Early Middle Ages, Vol. IV: The Popes in the Days of Feudal Anarchy, 891-999 (1910)
 Norwich, John Julius, The Popes: A History (2011)

9th-century births
904 deaths
People from Ardea, Lazio
Popes
Italian popes
10th-century popes
Italian murder victims